GKIDS is an American film distributor based in New York with, according to the Los Angeles Times, a focus on "sophisticated, indie" animation. GKIDS releases critically acclaimed, mostly hand-drawn, international films—such as the works of the independent Japanese anime studio Studio Ghibli—to North American audiences. GKIDS also distributes computer animated and stop-motion films in addition to hand-drawn ones, as well as American films by independent filmmakers. The name is said to be an acronym for "Guerrilla Kids International Distribution Syndicate".

History 
GKIDS was founded in 2008 by Eric Beckman, who previously co-founded and ran the New York International Children's Film Festival with his partner, Emily Shapiro. Their first general release was Azur & Asmar, a French film dubbed in English for British and Irish audiences.

The company attained national recognition with the 2010 release of The Secret of Kells, the debut film by Irish animator Tomm Moore, which received a nomination for Best Animated Feature at the 82nd Academy Awards. This surprise nomination was followed by two more Best Animated Feature nominations at the 84th Academy Awards, Spanish-language Chico and Rita and French-language A Cat in Paris. Both nominations were considered highly surprising by film insiders, beating out such notables as The Adventures of Tintin and Cars 2—the first eligible Pixar film not to be nominated since the category's founding. This marked the first time that an independent distributor had two films in the Best Animated Feature category in the same year, a decision which Puss in Boots director Chris Miller said indicated the Academy's "respect for diversity."

In September 2011, GKIDS announced the acquisition of the North American theatrical distribution rights to the Studio Ghibli library, that were previously held by Walt Disney Studios Motion Pictures. Walt Disney Studios Home Entertainment, however, retained the home media distribution rights in Asia (including Southeast Asia such as China and Taiwan, and Pony Canyon's subsidiary in Japan). GKIDS has since also managed the North American distribution of three new Studio Ghibli films, From Up on Poppy Hill in 2013, The Tale of the Princess Kaguya in 2014, and When Marnie Was There in 2015 as well as the first-time North American releases of Only Yesterday and Ocean Waves in 2016. On July 17, 2017, it was announced that the North American home media rights to the Ghibli library (with the exception of Grave of the Fireflies and The Wind Rises) had transitioned from Disney to GKIDS (The Wind Rises being reissued on September 22, 2020), with the distributor announcing plans to begin re-issuing the films beginning in October. Beginning with these releases, Shout! Factory became GKIDS' new home video distributor, taking over from Universal Pictures Home Entertainment (whose contract with GKIDS expired in late-2018) and Cinedigm (whose contract with GKIDS expired in late-2013).

Founder Eric Beckman received the Mifa & Variety Animation Personality of the Year Award at Annecy in June 2017.

In 2020, partnering with TMS Entertainment, GKIDS will be handling the American and Canadian release of Lupin III: The First, a 3DCG film adaptation of Monkey Punch's (Kazuhiko Kato) Lupin the Third franchise.

In October 2020, GKIDS announced their license to the Neon Genesis Evangelion TV series, as well as the films, Death (True)2 and The End of Evangelion for a release in 2021. This marks the first Blu-ray release of the anime in North America.

In February 2022, GKIDS and Tubi announced that they had entered a content partnership deal, while the National Film Board of Canada and Crunchyroll (Funimation's successor after rebranding, for example Human Lost, Deep Insanity: The Lost Child and Josee, the Tiger and the Fish, whose contract with GKIDS expired in late-2021) signed its distribution and a partnership deal, after a six-month negotiations.

In March 2022, GKIDS announced their license to Makoto Shinkai's earlier works, Voices of a Distant Star, The Place Promised in Our Early Days, 5 Centimeters per Second, and Children Who Chase Lost Voices, and will release them on home video in later 2022.

Style and reception 
While films distributed by GKIDS span a wide range of nationalities, languages, and animation styles, the distributor focuses almost exclusively on "handmade, mostly auteur-driven animated movies" created by individual animators working with small teams. Founder Eric Beckman has described the animated market in the U.S. as "dominated by expensive-to-produce, expensive-to-distribute movies". To this end, the company relies heavily on critical reception and accolades to attract audiences, rather than big-budget marketing campaigns. Beckman has said of the Academy Awards, "The Oscars are the great equalizer. You don't have to spend millions to reach millions, you look to a smaller group of people who know and like film … But you've got to start with something super."

As a result of this focus on artful, stylistically distinct animation, GKIDS has been hailed by critics and animation insiders as a welcome complement to the standard Hollywood fare, being referred to variously as "the saints of independent animation," "one of the most notable independent distribution companies in the US," and "the country's best distributor [for] traditional hand-drawn animation." Industry magazine Film Journal International said of the company's track record, "The reason GKIDS films keep getting nominated despite the company's low (relative to Disney, DreamWorks, et al.) profile is that, simply put, their films tend to be really good."

Ten feature films released by GKIDS have a perfect, 100% "Fresh" rating on review aggregator Rotten Tomatoes: Sita Sings the Blues, Only Yesterday, Approved for Adoption, The Tale of the Princess Kaguya,
Mind Game,
This Magnificent Cake!, Okko's Inn, On-Gaku: Our Sound, Evangelion: 3.0+1.0 Thrice Upon a Time, and Goodbye, Don Glees!. Sita Sings the Blues, combining stylistic elements of Rajput painting, shadow puppetry, vector graphic animation, and Squigglevision, was selected by Chicago Sun-Times reviewer Roger Ebert for his annual Ebertfest, calling it "one of the year's best films".

Not all have been broadly successful with critics, though: Mia and the Migoo (distributed in theaters by GKIDS and on home video by Entertainment One) (38%), Fireworks (43%), The Deer King (58%), MFKZ (39%), and Earwig and the Witch (29%) are, as of September 2022, the only five with "Rotten" ratings.

Films distributed by GKIDS

References

External links 
 
 

2008 establishments in New York City
American companies established in 2008
Anime companies
Entertainment companies based in New York City
Entertainment companies established in 2008
Film distributors of the United States
Home video companies of the United States
Mass media companies established in 2008
Privately held companies based in New York City